The following is a list of presidents of Dartmouth College.

Presidents

References

Dartmouth College
Dartmouth